The 2008 European Rowing Championships were held at the Schinias Olympic Rowing and Canoeing Centre, Marathon, Greece, between 16 and 20 September 2008. They were the 2nd annual event after the decision made in May 2006 by the FISA to re-establish the European Rowing Championships.

Owing to a big storm announced on the Centre, all finales (A and B) took place on Saturday, 20 September and not Sunday, 21 September, as initially scheduled.

Medal summary

Men's results

Women's results

Medal table

External links
 Official Site
 Results

2008 in rowing
Rowing competitions in Greece
2008
International sports competitions hosted by Greece